Ahmet Kiliç (born 20 March 1984) is a Dutch footballer who plays for Jeugd '90 in the Derde Klasse.

Career

Professional
Kiliç played in the youth of Edesche Boys, DTS '35 and Vitesse, and made his debut on 7 November 2003 for AGOVV. He made his professional debut in the match against Fortuna Sittard, which was won 1–4 by AGOVV. He came on for Koen Garritsen in the 86th minute. In 2007 he joined Yeni Kırşehirspor in Turkey. There, he was not paid his salary and he returned to the Netherlands in early-2008 and where he applied for a status as a free agent and financial compensation through the court.

Lower level
Kiliç continued his career with amateur club De Treffers. In 2013, he joined Bennekom and from the 2014–15 season he also started managing FC Jeugd '90. In 2015, his career as a player at Bennekom came to an end after he was suspended for 18 months in September 2014 after participating in a brawl against opponent SV Huizen. In 2017, Kiliç had to end his coaching duties at Jeugd '90 because he did not have the required coaching diplomas. He continued in 2018 as a player at WAVV and from 2019 returned to Jeugd '90.

References

External links

1984 births
Living people
Dutch people of Turkish descent
Dutch footballers
People from Ede, Netherlands
Footballers from Gelderland
Association football midfielders
AGOVV Apeldoorn players
Kırşehirspor footballers
De Treffers players
SBV Vitesse players
Eerste Divisie players
Vierde Divisie players
Derde Divisie players
TFF Second League players